Those Old Love Letters is a 1992 Estonian drama film directed by Mati Põldre. The film was selected as the Estonian entry for the Best Foreign Language Film at the 65th Academy Awards, but was not accepted as a nominee.

Cast
 Rain Simmul as Raimond Valgre
 Liis Tappo as Alice
 Ülle Kaljuste as Emma
 Marika Korolev as Eva
 Kärt Tomingas as Lily
 Lii Tedre as Mother
 Marina Levtova as Niina
 Jaan Rekkor as Muna
 Tõnu Kilgas as Leo
 Andres Lepik as Ants
 Vladimir Laptev as Captain
 Sulev Teppart as Nauding
 Guido Kangur as Kaarel

See also
 List of submissions to the 65th Academy Awards for Best Foreign Language Film
 List of Estonian submissions for the Academy Award for Best Foreign Language Film

References

External links
 

1992 films
1992 drama films
Estonian drama films
Estonian-language films
1990s biographical films
Films about composers
Cultural depictions of Estonian people